Jack Kent may refer to:

Jack Kent (politician) (1870–1946), British politician with the Socialist Party of Great Britain
Jack Kent (illustrator) (1920–1985), author-illustrator of children's books
Jack Kent (footballer), 1891–1892 Everton player

See also
John Kent (disambiguation)
Jonathan Kent (disambiguation)
Jack o' Kent, an English folkloric character based in the Welsh Marches